Alberton-Roseville was a provincial electoral district for the Legislative Assembly of Prince Edward Island, Canada. It was formerly known as Alberton-Miminegash from 1996 to 2007.

It includes, among others, the following communities:

Alberton
Roseville
Greenmount-Montrose
Montrose
Central Kildare
Mill River East
Union
Brockton
Brooklyn
St. Edward (southern-half)
St. Lawrence
St. Louis (southern-half)
Miminegash (southern-half)
Center Line Road
Huntley
Alma
Woodvale
Elmsdale
Northport
Cascumpec
Hebron

Members

Election results

Alberton-Roseville, 2007–2019

2016 electoral reform plebiscite results

Alberton-Miminegash, 1996–2007

References

 Alberton-Roseville information

Former provincial electoral districts of Prince Edward Island